The 1989 Italian Grand Prix was a Formula One motor race held at Monza on 10 September 1989. It was the twelfth race of the 1989 Formula One season.

Alain Prost took his fourth and final win of the season after McLaren teammate and pole-sitter Ayrton Senna suffered an engine failure with nine laps to go, thus extending the Frenchman's lead over the Brazilian in the Drivers' Championship to 20 points. Having earlier announced that he was moving to Ferrari for 1990, Prost dropped his winners' trophy from the podium into the crowd, to the severe disapproval of his team manager Ron Dennis. Gerhard Berger, the man Prost would be replacing at Ferrari, recorded his first finish of the season with second, followed by the two Williams of Thierry Boutsen and Riccardo Patrese. The final points went to Jean Alesi in the Tyrrell and Martin Brundle in the Brabham.

Pre-race
Before the Italian Grand Prix, Alain Prost announced that he had signed with Ferrari for the upcoming 1990 season. To the Tifosi who had previously seen Prost as the villain, he was now the hero of the crowd. It mattered not that he was still driving for McLaren, he was a confirmed Ferrari driver now and was treated as such (in previous years he had been jostled, jeered, and even pelted with tomatoes by some of the Tifosi for daring to beat the Ferraris).

Prost's announcement allowed Frank Williams to re-sign Riccardo Patrese for 1990 (Prost had offers from both Ferrari and Williams). Lotus also announced at the Grand Prix that they would be using the Lamborghini V12 engine in 1990. They also confirmed that their 1990 drivers would be Derek Warwick and the teams test driver Martin Donnelly.

Qualifying

Pre-qualifying report
For the first time in six Grands Prix, Onyx were not fastest in pre-qualifying. That credit went to Larrousse-Lola, as their cars were first and second on Friday morning, with Philippe Alliot ahead of Michele Alboreto. Third was Nicola Larini in the Osella, with Bertrand Gachot's Onyx fourth. Gachot's team-mate Stefan Johansson missed out in fifth.

Sixth was the AGS of Gabriele Tarquini, with Roberto Moreno's Coloni seventh. Eighth was Larini's Osella team-mate Piercarlo Ghinzani, his eleventh pre-qualifying failure this season. As at the previous meeting, the Zakspeeds were ninth and tenth, Bernd Schneider again ahead of Aguri Suzuki. Argentine Oscar Larrauri had returned to EuroBrun for whom he raced in 1988, replacing Swiss driver Gregor Foitek, but with no improvement down in eleventh. Twelfth was the other AGS of Yannick Dalmas, ahead only of the second Coloni of Enrico Bertaggia.

Pre-qualifying classification

Qualifying report
Predictably, the McLaren-Honda of Ayrton Senna was the fastest in qualifying for his 38th career pole position. Second was a surprise as Ferrari's Gerhard Berger joined Senna on the front row, whilst his teammate Nigel Mansell was third. Prost was only 4th, some 1.79 seconds slower than his Brazilian teammate, publicly complaining all weekend of a down on power engine compared to Senna's.

Prost's claims that Honda were favouring Senna were refuted by both Honda and McLaren boss Ron Dennis. However Prost's assertion was supported by former Honda drivers Mansell and  World Champion Keke Rosberg who also told the press that when it became known they would not be driving Honda powered cars any more that their engines did not work as well or have as much power as was previous. BBC commentator Murray Walker also reported during the race itself that Prost was over  slower than Senna through the speed trap in the race morning warm-up session despite the two cars running similar wing settings.

Senna's time of 1:23.720 in his V10 McLaren-Honda was 2.254 seconds faster than he had been a year earlier in the turbocharged McLaren MP4/4. His time was only 0.26 seconds shy of the fastest ever lap of the Monza circuit set by Nelson Piquet in a Williams-Honda in qualifying for the 1987 race when the turbo engines were developing some  more than the naturally aspirated engines of 1989.

Eddie Cheever, who had finished 3rd in the 1988 race, failed to qualify his Arrows-Ford. It was the second time in 1989 that the American had failed to qualify for a race. His teammate Derek Warwick qualified 16th. The Brabham-Judd of Stefano Modena was excluded from the meeting when his car was found to be underweight. This promoted the Minardi of Luis Pérez-Sala onto the grid.

Qualifying classification

Race

Race report
As the grid was in the process of forming up before the start, the McLaren team transferred the settings from Senna's car to Prost's in the hope of curing its handling problem (Prost had actually been more than 2 seconds slower in the race morning warm up than Senna). Prost would later say that while handling and grip were significantly improved, the down on power engine remained and despite the same wing settings he still could not match his teammate for straight line speed.

Senna led from the start and built up a small lead over Berger, while Mansell (whose 'development' V12 engine was not revving right) and especially Prost struggled to stay in touch. Indeed, in the early stages of the race Prost, who was getting used to his cars new set up, was having a hard time holding off the V10 Williams-Renault of Thierry Boutsen, though the BBC's James Hunt explained that Prost was using a harder set of "B" compound tyres in the hope of not having to pit during the race.

Emanuele Pirro was the races first retirement, the transmission in his Benetton-Ford not lasting a single lap. Only just longer was the Lola-Lamborghini of Philippe Alliot. The V12 powered Lolas of Alliot and Michele Alboreto had easily been the fastest in pre-qualifying, and Alliot went on to qualify a fine 7th (ahead of the Benetton's) before spinning into the sand trap at Ascari on just his second lap.

Alessandro Nannini's Benetton lost its brakes on lap 33 putting him into retirement, while Nigel Mansell suffered gearbox failure on lap 41. Through all of this, Senna was still comfortably in the lead with Prost having fought his way past Berger into second following Mansell's retirement. Prost passed Berger in front of the pits and the main grandstand and this saw the unusual sight of the Tifosi cheering when a McLaren passed a Ferrari. It must be remembered though that Prost was a confirmed Ferrari driver for 1990 while Berger, the hero of the 1988 race, was leaving the Scuderia to take Prost's seat at McLaren. The Williams' pair of Boutsen and Patrese, having found the limits of the older FW12 model, were circulating in 4th and 5th places but at no stage threatened the leaders.

On lap 44 the roar of the crowd told the story as the V10 Honda in Senna's McLaren comprehensively blew up going into the Parabolica, dumping its oil onto the rear tyres and sending Senna into a gentle spin and retirement, handing Prost the lead which he held to win his first Italian Grand Prix since 1985. Berger finished second for not only his first points of the season but indeed his first race finish while Boutsen came home third. Despite Prost's engine complaints, he still managed to set the fastest lap of the race on lap 43.

Prost's win restored his 20-point championship lead over Senna with only four races remaining in the season. However, due to the "Best 11" scoring system, Prost had now scored major points in 11 races while Senna could still score from all four remaining races. This meant that unless Prost won races, he would be able to score only a small number of points for the remainder of the season while Senna could conceivably score a maximum of 36 points (and win the championship) if he won the last four rounds.

McLaren-Honda won the Constructors' Championship with four races left.

Race classification

Championship standings after the race
 Bold Text indicates World Champions

Drivers' Championship standings

Constructors' Championship standings

 Note: Only the top five positions are included for both sets of standings.

References
 

Italian Grand Prix
Italian Grand Prix
Grand Prix
Italian Grand Prix